Indian Paintbrush most often refers to:
 Castilleja, a genus of annual and perennial herbaceous plants native to the west of the Americas

Indian Paintbrush may also refer to:
 Butterfly weed (Asclepias tuberosa), a North American milkweed in the family Apocynaceae
 Hawkweed (Hieracium)
 Indian Paintbrush (production company), a production company owned by Steven Rales, whose productions include The Darjeeling Limited, Towelface and Fantastic Mr. Fox